Baharipur is a village in Pindra Tehsil of Varanasi district in the Indian state of Uttar Pradesh. The village falls under the Aharak gram panchayat. The village is about 20 kilometers North-West of Varanasi city, 291 kilometers South-East of state capital Lucknow and 805 kilometers South-East of the national capital Delhi.

Demography
Baharipur has 161 families with the total population of 1,273. Sex ratio of the village is 872 and child sex ratio is 581. Uttar Pradesh state average for both ratios is 912 and 902 respectively .

Transportation
Baharipur is connected by air (Lal Bahadur Shastri Airport), train (Babatpur railway station) and by road. The nearest operational airports are Varanasi airport (5 kilometers South-East) and Allahabad Airports (143 kilometers West).

See also
Pindra Tehsil
Pindra (Assembly constituency)

Notes
  All demographic data is based on 2011 Census of India.

References 

Villages in Varanasi district